Amphorygma ceylonensis, is a species of weevil found in Sri Lanka.

Description
This species has a body length is about 2.5 mm. Body black, with dense brownish grey scales. Forehead more convex. Rostrum distinctly broader than long. Antennae with longer and more slender funicle as well as pointed club. Prothorax broader than long, with more strongly rounded sides. Elytra much less rounded at the base, and almost truncate.

References 

Curculionidae
Insects of Sri Lanka
Beetles described in 1916